The 2022–23 Alcorn State Braves basketball team represents Alcorn State University in the 2022–23 NCAA Division I men's basketball season. The Braves, led by third-year head coach Landon Bussie, play their home games at the Davey Whitney Complex in Lorman, Mississippi as members of the Southwestern Athletic Conference.

Previous season
The Braves finished the 2021–22 season 17–17, 14–4 in SWAC play to finish as SWAC regular season champions. In the SWAC tournament, they defeated Prairie View A&M and Alabama A&M, before falling to Texas Southern in the SWAC championship game. As a regular season conference champion who failed to win their conference tournament title, they received an automatic bid to the NIT, where they lost in the first round to Texas A&M.

Roster

Schedule and results

|-
!colspan=12 style=| Exhibition

|-
!colspan=12 style=| Non-conference regular season

|-
!colspan=12 style=| SWAC regular season

|-
!colspan=9 style=| SWAC tournament

|-
!colspan=9 style=| NIT

Sources

References

Alcorn State Braves basketball seasons
Alcorn State Braves
Alcorn State Braves basketball
Alcorn State Braves basketball
Alcorn State